Mario Williams (born January 21, 2003) is an American football wide receiver for the USC Trojans. He previously played at Oklahoma.

Early life and high school
Williams grew up in Tampa, Florida and attended Plant City High School. As a senior, he caught 40 passes for 743 yards with 8 touchdowns in nine games played and was named a second team All-American by Sports Illustrated. Williams was considered a consensus top-50 recruit in his class nationally. He committed to play college football at Oklahoma over offers Alabama, Florida, Georgia, and LSU. Williams finished his high school career with 160 receptions for 3,191 yards and 45 touchdowns.

College career
Williams joined the Oklahoma Sooners as an early enrollee. Williams was named the Big 12 Conference Newcomer of the Week after catching 5 passes for 100 yards and one touchdown in a 52-21 win over Texas Tech. He finished the season with 35 receptions for 380 yards and four touchdowns. Shortly after the end of the season and the departure of Oklahoma head coach Lincoln Riley for USC, Williams entered the transfer portal.

Williams ultimately transferred to USC. He also announced his intention to play baseball for the Trojans starting in 2023.

References

External links
USC Trojans bio

Living people
Players of American football from Tampa, Florida
American football wide receivers
USC Trojans football players
Oklahoma Sooners football players
2003 births